Gabriel Damon Lavezzi (born April 23, 1976) is an American former actor. His acting career involved a leading voice role as a child in the 1988 film The Land Before Time, and a variety of live-action guest roles on television.

Biography
Damon's career began with appearances in numerous commercials, with his first role in the 1984 TV series Call to Glory. He voiced Littlefoot the Apatosaurus in the first The Land Before Time movie, and Little Nemo in Little Nemo: Adventures in Slumberland. In 1990 he appeared as the juvenile criminal Hob in RoboCop 2 and in 1992 as Spot Conlon in Newsies. Damon has also made guest appearances in several television series, such as ER, Call to Glory, Star Trek: The Next Generation and Baywatch. 

Damon retired from the entertainment industry in 2006.

Filmography

 1984 Call to Glory as R.H. Sarnac
 1984 Shattered Vows as Daryl
 1985 Amazing Stories as Bobby Mynes
 1985 Punky Brewster as Lyle
 1985 Diff'rent Strokes as Timmy Frankel
 1985 Riptide as Simon Flynn
 1986 Stranger in My Bed as Stuart Slater
 1986-1987 One Big Family as Roger Hatton
 1986 Webster as Mark
 1986 Convicted as Joel Forbes
 1986 Our House as Tommy
 1987 Terminus as Mati
 1987 Good Morning Miss Bliss as Bradley
 1987 Highway to Heaven as Bobby Martin
 1987 Pound Puppies as Additional voices
 1987 Who's the Boss? as Little Cornelius
 1988 Journey to Spirit Island as Willie
 1988 Tequila Sunrise as Cody McKussic
 1988 Ohara as Unknown 
 1988 The Land Before Time as Littlefoot (voice)
 1988 Superman as Additional voices
 1989 Little Nemo: Adventures in Slumberland as Nemo (1992 voice over)
 1989-1997 Baywatch as Tod
 1989 Star Trek: The Next Generation Season 3 Episode 5 "The Bonding" as Jeremy Aster
 1989 Just Like Family as Coop
 1989 Growing Pains as Kenny
 1989 Mr. Belvedere as Billy Podell
 1989 Just the Ten of Us as Alex Cutler
 1989-1990 The New Lassie as Wayne
 1990 RoboCop 2 as Hob
 1990 TaleSpin as Additional voices
 1990 W.I.O.U. as Drew
 1990 The Rock as Mario Dipucci
 1991 Iron Maze as Mikey
 1991 Eerie Indiana as Nicholas
 1992 Newsies as 'Spot' Conlon
 1992 The Commish as Brad Harris
 1993-1994 The 
Little Mermaid as Additional voices
 1993 Sirens as Nicholas 'Beetle' Marque
 1997 ER as Tommy
 1997 Bayou Ghost as Peter
 2001 Social Misfits as Jason
 2005 Planet Ibsen (also co-producer) as Young Strindberg
 2006 Danny Boy as Danny (final role)

References

External links

Official Myspace Page

1976 births
Male actors from Nevada
American male child actors
American male film actors
American male television actors
Living people
Actors from Reno, Nevada
American real estate brokers